"Lonely This Christmas" is a Christmas song by the English glam rock band Mud, that 
topped the UK Singles Chart in 1974, selling over 750,000 copies and reaching Christmas number one.

Song
Written and produced by Nicky Chinn and Mike Chapman, "Lonely This Christmas" was Mud's second number one single in the UK, spending four weeks at the top in December 1974 and January 1975. It was the third number one single that year for the ChinniChap writing and production team, and was performed in the style of Elvis Presley's slower songs from his later career.

Performances
The song is noted for a performance on Top of the Pops in which guitarist Rob Davis was covered in tinsel and wore Christmas baubles as earrings, while vocalist Les Gray sang to a ventriloquist's dummy.
Its final appearance on Top of the Pops was on 8 January 1975, which was coincidentally the fortieth birthday of Elvis Presley. At the conclusion of the song, vocalist Les Gray turned to the camera and solemnly said, 'Merry Christmas darling wherever you are.'

Charts

Weekly charts

Year-end charts

Certifications

References

Songs about loneliness
1974 singles
British Christmas songs
UK Singles Chart number-one singles
Irish Singles Chart number-one singles
Dutch Top 40 number-one singles
Ultratop 50 Singles (Flanders) number-one singles
Songs written by Nicky Chinn
Songs written by Mike Chapman
1974 songs
RAK Records singles
Song recordings produced by Mike Chapman
Mud (band) songs